Piz Materdell (2,967 m) is a mountain of the Albula Alps, overlooking Lake Sils in the canton of Graubünden. It lies on the range between the Septimer Pass and the Julier Pass, which culminates at Piz Lagrev.

References

External links
 Piz Materdell on Hikr

Mountains of Switzerland
Mountains of Graubünden
Mountains of the Alps
Two-thousanders of Switzerland